Beatrice (French:La passion Béatrice, Italian:Quarto comandamento) is a 1987 French-Italian historical drama film directed by Bertrand Tavernier and starring Bernard-Pierre Donnadieu, Julie Delpy and Nils Tavernier. Set in a castle in France during the Hundred Years' War, it recounts the sufferings of Béatrice at the hands of her brutal father.

Plot
When a knight goes off to fight the English, he leaves his young son François at his castle to guard his wife. Catching her in bed with a man, François stabs the lover to death and retreats to the tower, where he waits for his father's return. Years later, he goes off with his son Arnaud to fight and leaves his young daughter Béatrice to guard the castle. When her menfolk are captured by the English, she sells goods and lands to raise ransoms. Years later, disillusioned by war and captivity, the two return to a depleted heritage. While Arnaud has remained soft, François has become bitter and hard. 

He terrorises the neighbourhood, raping and looting, and tyrannises his household. His wild lust leads him to take Béatrice's viginity by force, saying that she is now his wife. The village priest refuses to marry the pair, so François has the idea of marrying her to a wealthy commoner who bought much of their land. The man demurs, however, preferring to find a virgin he does not have to share with her father. Though Béatrice has to submit her body to her father, nothing will change her mind : she casts spells, and pays a witch to wish death on her ravisher. 

When she realises that she is pregnant, she tells her brother and asks him to kick her in the abdomen. François sees this effort to destroy his child and takes his revenge. Dressing Arnaud as a girl, he gives him a sporting start and then rides after him with all his henchmen in a wild manhunt, forcing Béatrice to ride with them. On returning to the castle, Béatrice finds that in addition to losing her brother her pet birds have been killed. She goes up to her father's room and stabs him to death.

Cast
 Bernard-Pierre Donnadieu as François de Cortemart  
 Julie Delpy as Béatrice de Cortemart  
 Nils Tavernier as Arnaud de Cortemart  
 Monique Chaumette as La mère de François  
 Michèle Gleizer as Hélène  
 Maxime Leroux as Richard  
 Jean-Claude Adelin as Bertrand Lemartin  
 Robert Dhéry as Raoul  
 Jean-Louis Grinfeld as Maître Blanche  
 Claude Duneton as The priest  
 Isabelle Nanty as The baby-sitter
 Jean-Luc Rivals as Jehan  
 Roselyne Vuillaume as Marie  
 Maïté Maillé as La Noiraude  
 Albane Guilhe as La Recluse  
 Marie Privat as Marguerite  
 Sébastien Konieczny as François Enfant  
 Vincent Saint-Ouen as Le père de François enfant 
 Tina Sportolaro as La mère de François enfant  
 François Hadji-Lazaro as Curé départ guerre 
 Nicole Siffre as Pauline  
 Myriam Thomas as Mariette  
 Christophe Rea as Jacques  
 David Ordonez as Thomas  
 Jacques Raynaud as Joseph  
 Pétrus Léo Crombe as Gildas  
 Béatrice Abatut as Blandine   
 Marie Cosnay as Nicolette  
 Sylvie Beyssen, Anne Bolon, Frédérique Figuero, Agnès Hick as Prostituées

Production
Bertrand Tavernier said that Julie Delpy had an exceptional power of concentration and emotion. She had to shoot a quite difficult scene completely naked. He told her there would be no rehearsal. The first take went very well, but she asked for a second. She said to him: "I can do better."

References

Bibliography
 Greene, Naomi. Landscapes of Loss: The National Past in Postwar French Cinema. Princeton University Press, 1999.
 Waters, Sandra. Narrating the Italian Historical Novel. ProQuest, 2009.

External links
 
 
 

1987 films
1980s historical drama films
1980s Italian-language films
French historical drama films
Italian historical drama films
Films directed by Bertrand Tavernier
Films set in the 14th century
Incest in film
1987 drama films
1980s French-language films
1980s Italian films
1980s French films